Robert William Kistner (August 23, 1917 – February 6, 1990) was a gynecologist who specialized in the treatment of endometriosis and was involved in the early development of the birth control pill.

Early life
Kistner was born in Cincinnati, Ohio, the son of Alfred and Gertrude Kistner; he graduated from the University of Cincinnati and from its medical school in 1942.

Career 
Following his internship at Cincinnati General Hospital (now the University of Cincinnati Medical Center), he was a resident at Johns Hopkins in Baltimore and Kings County Hospital Center in New York, before moving to Boston Hospital for Women (now Brigham and Women's Hospital). Kistner was a senior attending physician at Brigham and Women's Hospital. He was an associate clinical professor at Harvard Medical School, and specialized in surgery to correct infertility.   He was previously a chief of staff at Boston Hospital for Women, and a consultant for the New England Baptist Hospital.

Kistner was named the 32nd president of the American Fertility Society in 1979. He was a member of the American College of Surgeons, and a fellow of the American College of Obstetricians and Gynecologists.  He was an advocate of the first birth control pills, not only as a contraceptive, but also for protection against uterine cancer.

Kistner served in the Pacific theatre of World War II as a flight surgeon for the United States Army Air Corps, and chief of air evacuation. When the war ended, he continued consulting for the Air Force.

Works 
Kistner was the author of more than 175 articles and numerous books, including:
 
 Gynecology: Principles and Practice 1964.  republished numerous times and widely used in medical schools.
 
  (With Behrman SJ, edited by Patton GW.)

According to the Duka and DeCherney, among Kistner's notable journal-published research are three papers published early in his career: 
 "Induction of ovulation with clomiphene citrate (clomid)"
 "Histological effects of progestins on hyperplasia and carcinoma in situ of the endometrium"
 "The treatment of endometriosis by inducing pseudopregnancy with ovarian hormones"

Honors and awards 
The Kistner Library at Brigham and Women's Hospital was dedicated after his death to his 34 years of service.

Personal life 
Kistner was married to Georgia Golde in 1943, and to Janet Langhart in 1978. He had four children with Golde: Dana, Robert Jr., Stephen, and Peter. The Boston Globe "Who's Who" in Boston medicine described Kistner in 1980 as well dressed, a "brilliant surgeon as well as researcher" and "one of the best known gynecologists in the world long before he achieved a special kind of local celebrity with his marriage". After 38 years of practicing medicine and teaching, he retired and moved to Wellington, Florida, where he died at the age of 72.

Kistner served as a trustee for Noble and Greenough School and was a member of the Harvard Club of Boston.

Notes

References

1917 births
1990 suicides
Harvard Medical School faculty
American gynecologists
Physicians from Cincinnati
University of Cincinnati alumni
Suicides by sharp instrument in the United States
Suicides in Florida
20th-century American physicians